The Sanctuary River Cabin No. 31, also known as Sanctuary Patrol Cabin, is a log cabin that was listed on the National Register of Historic Places in 1986. The listing includes an outhouse and a tool box and storage shed.

It was built by the Alaska Road Commission in 1926 as the center of a road construction camp, and was adopted by park rangers in wintertime dog sled patrols as a replacement for a different cabin located about five miles south.

This was the cabin where Adolph Murie "began his field work investigating the wolf-Dall sheep relationship in the park...in the summer of 1939."

References

Park buildings and structures on the National Register of Historic Places in Alaska
Buildings and structures completed in 1926
Buildings and structures in Denali National Park and Preserve
National Register of Historic Places in Denali National Park and Preserve
1926 establishments in Alaska
Buildings and structures on the National Register of Historic Places in Denali Borough, Alaska